The Mangatu River is a river of the Gisborne Region of New Zealand's North Island. It flows south from its sources in rough hill country northeast of Matawai to reach the Waipaoa River at Whatatutu.

See also
List of rivers of New Zealand

References

Rivers of the Gisborne District
Rivers of New Zealand